The Inya is a river in Khabarovsk Krai, Russian Far East. The river is a tourist destination for rafting and kayaking.

The basin of the Inya is a spawning ground for salmon. Other fish species are also abundant in its waters, as well as crab fisheries near the mouth.

Course 

The Inya flows roughly southwards across mountainous terrain with waterfalls and rapids in an area of mountain tundra. The Kheidzhan Range on the left side of its valley separates it from the Taui (Kava) basin in the east. In its last stretch the river expands and fans out in many arms through a widening floodplain. Finally it flows into the Sea of Okhotsk by the Novaya Inya settlement. There are no other inhabited places near the river. 

The river freezes before mid October and stays frozen until mid May.

See also
List of rivers of Russia

References

External links
Inya River Watershed - Wild Salmon Center - Yumpu

Rivers of Khabarovsk Krai
Drainage basins of the Sea of Okhotsk